Little Vienna may refer to the numerous towns that closely resemble the architecture of the Austrian capital of Vienna:
 Bielsko-Biała, a city in Poland
 Cieszyn, a city in Poland
 Chernivtsi, a city in Ukraine
 Lviv, a city in Ukraine
 Rousse, a city in Bulgaria.
 Sumperk, a city in Czech republic
 Timișoara, a city in Romania
 Varaždin, a city in Croatia
 Zagreb, a city in Croatia
 Osijek, a city in Croatia
 Hongkou District, a district in Shanghai, China

Little Vienna